The Eger Graben (much less commonly called the Ohre or Ohře Graben;) is a geological structure in the Czech Republic. It runs southwards, parallel to the Ore Mountains and its formation is linked with that of the mountain range.

Topography 
The Ohře (equally commonly known in English by its German name Eger, hence the name of the trough) flows through the Eger Graben and separates the Ore Mountains from the Slavkov Forest and the Doupov Mountains. The trench continues to the northeast along the valley of the Bílina and later, as the North Bohemian Basin, separates the Ore Mountains from the Bohemian Central Mountains, where the River Ohře leaves the graben and flows into the Elbe south of the Bohemian Mountains.

Geology 
The Eger Graben is part of the European Cenozoic Rift System and was created geologically on the same principle as the Rhine Rift Valley. It was formed by the almost complete erosion of the Variscan Mountains and sits on a fault-block caused by the horizontal pressure of the African continental plate. This block dropped, however, in contrast to the surrounding area. The Ore Mountains are fault-block mountains which rise very gently in Germany, but drop very steeply into the Eger Graben. The trench thus follows the main fault line of the Ore Mountains. Researchers believe that a new volcano is in the process of forming and hope to be able to drill holes in the area to better study what they believe is an awakening volcano.

References

Sources 
P. De`zes*, S.M. Schmid, P.A. Ziegler (2004) Evolution of the European Cenozoic Rift System: interaction of the Alpine and Pyrenean orogens with their foreland lithosphere
Peter A. Ziegler (1990) Geological atlas of Western and Central Europe, Volume 2

Geography of the Czech Republic
Cenozoic rifts and grabens